Kevin R. Harvey is an American businessperson and venture capitalist. He is a founder and general partner at Benchmark Capital.

As a software entrepreneur, he founded companies such as StyleWare and Approach Software in the 1990s and was recognized for it.

Harvey is also known for founding Rhys Vineyards and its offshoot Aeris.

Harvey was ranked No. 27 on the 2011 Forbes''' Midas List and was No. 59 in 2012.

Early life and education
Harvey was born in Sunnyvale, California and spent his early life in Texas.

For his college education, Harvey attended Rice University and graduated with a BS degree in electrical engineering in 1987.

Career
The first company Harvey founded was StyleWare, a software company which was based in Houston and was a publisher of more than ten software products, including Multiscribe. In 1988, Claris Corporation, a subsidiary of Apple, acquired the company. After the purchase, the Styleware continued to develop it as ClarisWorks.

Harvey founded Approach Software and served as its president. He led the development of the first end-user client/server database for Microsoft Windows. Lotus Development acquired Approach Software in 1993.

Benchmark Capital
Harvey co-founded Benchmark Capital in 1995. The firm has invested in multiple companies, including eBay, OpenTable, Snapchat, Twitter and Uber. Some companies have gone to complete successful IPOs, including Red Hat and Proofpoint.

As a general partner at Benchmark Capital, Harvey also led the firm's investments in such companies as BOKU, Bytemobile (now part of Citrix Systems), CollabNet, CloudPassage, Eucalyptus Systems (acquired by HP), Highlight (acquired by Pinterest), Ingenio (acquired by AT&T), Metaweb (acquired by Google), MySQL, oDesk, oFoto (acquired by Kodak), RemarQ Communities (acquired by Critical Path, Inc.), RightScale, Tellme Networks (acquired by Microsoft), When.com (acquired by America Online), Zimbra (acquired by Yahoo!), and Minerva University.

Harvey serves on the boards of Upwork and Minerva.

Wine
In 1995, Harvey began his wine project planting vines in his backyard and making wine in his garage. This lead him to become the founder of Rhys Vineyards in the Santa Cruz Mountains, where he had his first harvest in 2004.

Rhys Vineyards has produced award-winning wines. Antonio Galloni, a wine critic, has called it, "one of the finest wineries in the United States."

Rhys Vineyards has developed eight estate vineyards. Six of these, including Alpine, Family Farm, Home, Horseshoe, Mount Pajaro and Skyline, are located in the Santa Cruz Mountains AVA. Two more vineyards, Bearwallow and Clarke Ranch, are located in Mendocino County.

Rhys Vineyards has also developed a ninth estate vineyard, Centennial Mountain, devoted to Italian grape varieties. These wines are sold under the Aeris label. As part of this project, the Aeris team brought in two Sicilian grape varieties, Carricante and Nerello Mascalese, that are not known to have been grown in California prior. The San Francisco Chronicle'' has described Carricante as "The best white wine you have never tasted". Aeris also owns two vineyards in Sicily and these wines are also sold under the Aeris label.

References

Living people
American computer businesspeople
American venture capitalists
Rice University alumni
Year of birth missing (living people)
People from Sunnyvale, California